The North West Regional Leaders Board is the Local Authority Leaders’ Board for the North West region of England. It was established on 15 July 2008 and replaced the North West Regional Assembly. It was initially based at Wigan, in Greater Manchester but has since moved to St Helens in Merseyside.

Structure and membership

The board has 23 members of which 15 represent local government in the region and the remainder are drawn from business and the third sector. Three local government representatives will be drawn from each Ceremonial County in the region i.e., Cumbria, Cheshire, Lancashire, Merseyside and Greater Manchester. A further 7 members represent Social Economic and Environmental Partners (SEEPs) and one further member is nominated by the Lake District National Park Authority. Participating (non-voting) observers can also be appointed.

The board holds an annual meeting in July where a Chair and Deputy Chair are elected. The Chair is currently Councillor Sir Richard Leese, and the Chief Executive is Phil Robinson.

Functions and responsibilities

The board will work in the areas of housing, energy and transport, will scrutinise the work of the Northwest Regional Development Agency and will contribute to the Single Regional Strategy combining economic development and spatial planning.

The forum's constitution describes its role as to:
 set the strategic direction for, contribute to the development of, support and approve the Regional Economic Strategy, Regional Spatial Strategy and any subsequent Single Regional Strategy
 approve the Forum budget
 influence key Regional strategies
 approve the Business Plan for the Forum
 monitor the delivery of the Business Plan
 approve and amend the Constitution and Standing Orders
 appoint its Chair and Deputy Chair
 appoint representatives to outside bodies.
 establish any sub-groups, appointing their Chairs and determining their terms of reference

References

External links
North West Employers
4NW Constitution

Local authority leaders' boards in England
Local government in North West England
2008 establishments in England
Organisations based in Merseyside
Government agencies established in 2008
Local Government Association